Alexandre François Étienne Jean Bouin (21 December 1888 – 29 September 1914) was a French middle-distance runner. He competed in the 1500m at the 1908 Olympics and the 5000m at the 1912 Olympics. He won a silver medal in the 5000m in 1912, behind Hannes Kolehmainen. His race against Kolehmainen has long been regarded as one of the most memorable moments in running. Kolehmainen and Bouin quickly pulled away from the others, with Bouin leading and Kolehmainen repeatedly trying to pass him. Kolehmainen succeeded only 20 metres from the finish, winning by 0.1 seconds. Both contenders broke the world record.

Bouin set three more world records: two in 1911, in the 3,000 m and 10,000 metres, and one in 1913, in the one-hour run (19,021 metres). The next year, he was killed in action during World War I. After that the Stade Jean-Bouin in the 16th arrondissement of Paris, home of the Stade Français rugby union club, was named after him. The French government made a stamp 
with his picture on it and many games have been held in his honor. A 10 km race under the name of Jean Bouin has taken place every year through the streets of Barcelona since 1920.

References

Further reading

 
 
 Godwin, Terry Complete Who's Who of International Rugby (Cassell, 1987)
 

1888 births
1914 deaths
Sportspeople from Marseille
French male middle-distance runners
French male long-distance runners
Olympic athletes of France
Olympic silver medalists for France
Athletes (track and field) at the 1908 Summer Olympics
Athletes (track and field) at the 1912 Summer Olympics
International Cross Country Championships winners
World record setters in athletics (track and field)
French military personnel killed in World War I
Medalists at the 1912 Summer Olympics
Olympic silver medalists in athletics (track and field)
Olympic cross country runners
20th-century French people